Nick Torres is an American songwriter from Huntsville, Alabama. He was the singer for the now defunct indie rock quartet Northstar. He currently performs under the moniker Cassino. He lives in Nashville, Tennessee.

Discography 
Northstar

 Hardcore Demo (1997)
 Early Demo 1 (1998)
 Blindcrush Demo (1999)
 There's More Where This Came From Demo (2000)
 Is This Thing Loaded Demo (2001)
 Is This Thing Loaded? (Triple Crown Records, 2002)
 Pollyanna (Triple Crown Records, 2004)
 The Uncomfortable Camera (2005) - DVD
 Broken Parachute (Speak Music Media, 2008)
 Pollyanna (Triple Crown Records, 2010) - Viny

Cassino

 Sounds of Salvation (March 29, 2007)
 Kingprince (October 28, 2009)
 The Weight of Bother (May 14, 2011)
 Bottlenecker (May 27, 2016)
 Yellowhammer (February 28, 2020)

References

Musicians from Huntsville, Alabama
Year of birth missing (living people)
Living people
Songwriters from Alabama